Bingo Viejo is a 1975 vinyl album recorded by Bing Crosby at his own expense during two sessions in 1975 at United Recorders, Hollywood. "Viejo" means "old" in Spanish.  He was accompanied by Paul Smith and his Orchestra.  Crosby, who called the LP his "Mexican album," leased the tracks to the English branch of Decca following negotiations with producer Geoff Milne and the album was issued on Decca's London label.

He also leased the tracks to a USA based label called Anahuac. They remixed the tracks and used some alternate takes (tracks 6, 7, 9 and 10). Bing Crosby himself felt that this improved the album and he wrote to his friend Leslie Gaylor in a letter dated July 11, 1977.
"The Bingo Viejo record has been remixed and it sounds much better than ever it did before. I don’t know what they did to it but they brought up the vocal a little more and cut down on the background, which made it sound a little more intimate and a little more personal."

The album has never been issued on CD.

Reception
The UK magazine The Gramophone reviewed the album saying: "Bingo Viejo" by old Bing Crosby himself is a typically warm Crosbyian salute to south of the border with ten songs sung in English and Spanish which will undoubtedly please his numerous adherents of either tongue. The numbers are mostly familiar ones like Green Eyes, Besame Mucho, Frenesi and The Breeze and I, and the arrangements are less than impressive, particularly the messy accompaniment for Amapola, which almost undermined the Old Groaner’s customary vocal serenity."

Record producer, Ken Barnes, felt that the album was a less successful effort than A Southern Memoir and he considered that the "main fault lies in the choice of some of the songs—notably ‘The Breeze and I’ and especially ‘Spanish Eyes’ which were clearly too rangy for any septuagenarian to sing, although sing them he does."

Track listing
SIDE ONE

SIDE TWO

References 

1975 albums
Bing Crosby albums
London Records albums